Noël Hébert (December 24, 1819 – 1868) was a farmer and political figure in Canada East. He represented Mégantic in the Legislative Assembly of the Province of Canada from 1858 to 1863.

He was born Pierre-Noël Hébert in Nicolet, the son of Pierre Hébert, a farmer of Acadian descent, and Louise Manseau. Hébert operated a farm near Arthabaskaville and served as a captain in the militia for Mégantic County. In 1849, he married Thérèse Bourk. He was defeated when he ran for reelection to the assembly in 1863. Hébert died in Kaskaskia, Illinois.

References

External links 
 

1819 births
1868 deaths
Members of the Legislative Assembly of the Province of Canada from Canada East
People from Centre-du-Québec